Happy Hour is the fourth studio album by American musician Uncle Kracker. It was released on September 15, 2009 under Atlantic Records. The album includes the single "Smile", which was originally released to pop, but later remixed to country music. Also released to the country format was the song "Good to Be Me" which was later recorded as a duet with Kid Rock. Rob Cavallo produced the album, except for "Good to Be Me", which was produced by Kid Rock, and "Hot Mess", which was produced by S*A*M and Sluggo.

Critical reception

Stephen Thomas Erlewine of Allmusic rated the album two-and-a-half stars out of five, saying "his attitude gets in his way, his party-hearty quips never jibing with his marshmallow music".

Track listing

Outtakes
 "Vegas Baby" (featuring Mr. Hahn of Linkin Park) - 4:07
 "The One That Got Away" - 3:34
 "That's What's Happenin" - 3:37

Chart performance

References

2009 albums
Uncle Kracker albums
Atlantic Records albums
Albums produced by Rob Cavallo
Country albums by American artists

Albums produced by Kid Rock